Errol Walters (born 26 July 1956) is a Jamaican former cyclist. He competed in the individual road race event at the 1976 Summer Olympics.

References

External links
 

1956 births
Living people
Jamaican male cyclists
Olympic cyclists of Jamaica
Cyclists at the 1976 Summer Olympics
Commonwealth Games competitors for Jamaica
Cyclists at the 1978 Commonwealth Games
Place of birth missing (living people)